Leonard Green may refer to:

Leonard Green (cricketer) (1890–1963), English cricketer
Leonard I. Green (1934–2002), founding partner of leveraged buyout firm Leonard Green & Partners
Leonard Green & Partners, a private equity firm based in Los Angeles
Lenny Green (1933–2019), baseball player
Len Green (born 1936), English footballer
Leonard Green (Friends), a fictional character on the television series Friends

See also
Leonard Greene (1918–2006), American inventor and engineer

Green, Leonard